Federica Isola (born 27 September 1999) is an Italian right-handed épée fencer and 2021 team Olympic bronze medalist.

Medal Record

World Championship

European Championship

Grand Prix

World Cup

References

External links

1999 births
Living people
Italian female épée fencers
World Fencing Championships medalists
Fencers at the 2020 Summer Olympics
Olympic fencers of Italy
Olympic medalists in fencing
Medalists at the 2020 Summer Olympics
Olympic bronze medalists for Italy
20th-century Italian women
21st-century Italian women